Pasquale Pane (born 11 March 1990) is an Italian professional footballer who plays as a goalkeeper for  club Avellino.

References

External links
 
 
 

1990 births
Living people
Footballers from Campania
Italian footballers
Association football goalkeepers
Serie C players
Serie D players
Eccellenza players
A.C. Monza players
Cavese 1919 players
A.S.D. Barletta 1922 players
S.S. Ischia Isolaverde players
F.C. Aprilia Racing Club players
Benevento Calcio players
Mantova 1911 players
S.S. Akragas Città dei Templi players
A.C.N. Siena 1904 players
A.S.D. Sicula Leonzio players
AZ Picerno players
U.S. Avellino 1912 players